Gary Paul Geidel (December 11, 1956 – September 11, 2001) was a New York City Fire Department (FDNY) firefighter killed during the September 11 attacks shortly before scheduled retirement.

Death
Gary Geidel was killed in New York during the September 11 attacks. His body was never found. Geidel had planned to retire later that year after 20 years as a firefighter; his last vacation was scheduled to start October 11, and retirement was to be on November 7, 2001.

At the National September 11 Memorial & Museum, Geidel is memorialized at the South Pool, on Panel S-10, along with other fallen firefighters from the FDNY Rescue 1.

Family
Geidel was the oldest son of Lt. Paul Geidel of FDNY Rescue 1. Paul's second son, FDNY firefighter Ralph Geidel, worked on the Ground Zero search party for 230 days looking for remains. On October 21, 2014, in California, Ralph died of cancer attributed to exposure to toxins at Ground Zero. As of 2016, Paul's third son, Michael, is an active firefighter on the FDNY. In 2016 Paul published a book about his own career, with the last chapter devoted to the 9/11 attack.

References

1956 births
2001 deaths
American terrorism victims
New York City firefighters
Terrorism deaths in New York (state)
Emergency workers killed in the September 11 attacks